Hobolochitto Creek is a stream in the U.S. state of Mississippi.

Hobolochitto is a name derived from the Choctaw language. Variant names are "Abolo Chitto", "Abolochitto River", "Bola Chitto", "Bolla Chitto", and "Hobolo Chitto".

References

Rivers of Mississippi
Rivers of Pearl River County, Mississippi
Mississippi placenames of Native American origin